The Tristia ("Sorrows" or "Lamentations") is a collection of letters written in elegiac couplets by the Augustan poet Ovid during his exile from Rome. Despite five books of his copious bewailing of his fate, the immediate cause of Augustus's banishment of the most acclaimed living Latin poet to Pontus in AD 8 remains a mystery. In addition to the Tristia, Ovid wrote another collection of elegiac epistles on his exile, the Epistulae ex Ponto. He spent several years in the outpost of Tomis and died without ever returning to Rome.

The Tristia was once viewed unfavorably in Ovid's oeuvre but has become the subject of scholarly interest in recent years.

The poems
The first volume was written during Ovid's journey into exile. It addresses his grieving wife, his friends — both the faithful and the false — and his past works, especially the Metamorphoses. Ovid describes his arduous travel to the furthest edge of the empire, giving him a chance to draw the obligatory parallels with the exiles of Aeneas and Odysseus (Ulysses) and excuse his work's failings. The introduction and dedication, which caution the departing volume against the dangers of its destination, were probably written last.

The second volume takes the form of a plea to Augustus to end the unhappy exile brought about by the carmen et error (poem and error) – the nature of the mistake is never made clear, although some speculate it may have had something to do with Ovid's overhearing (or rather discovery) of the adulterous nature of Augustus' daughter, Julia. He defends his work and his life with equal vigor, appealing to the many poets who had written on the same themes as he—among them Anacreon, Sappho, Catullus and even Homer.

The plea was unsuccessful; Ovid would live out the remainder of his years in exile among the Thracian Getae. The last three books of the Tristia grow grimmer as their author ages, heavy with the knowledge that he will never return to his home. At one point he even composes his epitaph:

The last part of the book addresses Ovid's wife, praising her loyalty throughout his years of exile and wishing that she be remembered for as long as his books are read.

Critical reception
Peter Green wrote in a translation of Ovid's exile poems that the Tristia "[has] not, on the whole, had a good press from posterity." Gordon Willis Williams referred to the work as "mostly a pale reflection of the genius that he had been." However, Ralph J. Hexter wrote in 1995 that literary critics were then "beginning to give the exile elegies a fresh look." A number of scholars have since viewed the collection favorably. It is listed among Ovid's major works by author David Malouf and scholar Matthew Woodcock. In Matthew Bunson's Encyclopedia of the Roman Empire, it is called "a powerful plea for justice."

References

Bibliography
Ovid and His Influence; Rand, Edward Kennard (Boston, Marshall Jones Company, 1925)

External links
 Tristia. Ex Ponto. – Latin with English translation by Arthur Leslie Wheeler (1924) - Loeb Classical Library edition
 English translation, five books
 Latin texts of Ovid

Poetry by Ovid
1st-century Latin books
Works about exile